These are the international rankings of Bosnia and Herzegovina

International rankings

References

Bosnia and Herzegovina